The 2017 Ohio Bobcats football team represented Ohio University in the 2017 NCAA Division I FBS football season. They were led by 13th-year head coach Frank Solich and played their home games at Peden Stadium in Athens, Ohio as members of the East Division of the Mid-American Conference. They finished the season 9–4, 5–3 in MAC play to finish in second play in the East Division. They received an invitation to the Bahamas Bowl where they defeated UAB.

Previous season 
The Bobcats finished the 2016 season 8–6, 6–2 in MAC play to finish in a two-way tie for the East Division title. They represented the East Division in the MAC Championship Game where they lost to Western Michigan. They were invited to the Dollar General Bowl where they lost to Troy.

Preseason 
In a preseason poll of league media, Ohio was picked to win the East Division with 11 first place votes.

Coaching staff

Source:

Schedule
Ohio announced their 2017 football schedule on January 23, 2017. In out-of-conference play, the Bobcats will host Hampton and Kansas and will travel to Purdue and former MAC-affiliate UMass.

Source:

Game summaries

Hampton

at Purdue

Kansas

at Eastern Michigan

at UMass

Central Michigan

at Bowling Green

Kent State

Miami (OH)

Toledo

at Akron

at Buffalo

vs. UAB–Bahamas Bowl

Roster

References

Ohio
Ohio Bobcats football seasons
Bahamas Bowl champion seasons
Ohio Bobcats football